Sunset Hill or Sunset Hills may refer to:
Sunset Hills, Los Angeles, a neighborhood with a Los Angeles Historic-Cultural Monument in Hollywood
Sunset Hill (Aberdeen, Mississippi)
Sunset Hill, a neighborhood of the Country Club District, Kansas City, Missouri
Sunset Hills, Missouri
Sunset Hill (Otsego County, New York), an elevation in Otsego County, New York
Sunset Hill (Warren, New York)
Sunset Hill, Spokane, a neighborhood in Washington
Sunset Hill, Seattle, a neighborhood and park in the Ballard area of Seattle, Washington
Sunset Hill (Alderson, West Virginia)